Kayes Region (Bambara: ߞߊߦߌ ߘߌߣߋߖߊ tr. Kayi Dineja) is one of eight first level national subdivisions in Mali called Regions. Its capital is the town of Kayes. The province was historically part of the Ghana Empire and the Mali Empire.

Geography 

The region of Kayes is bordered to the north by Mauritania, to the west by Senegal, to the south by Guinea and to the east by the region of Koulikoro.

In 2009 the region has a population of 1,996,812 inhabitants. Ethnic groups of the area include Soninkés, Khassonkés, Malinkés, Dialonkés, and Fulas.

Several rivers cross the region: the Baoulé, the Bafing, and the Bakoy which join at the town of Bafoulabé to form the Sénégal River. The Falls of Félou (15 km from Kayes), the Falls of Gouina (60 km to the south-east of Kayes on the Sénégal River), Talari Gorges, Lake Magui and Lake Doro are located in the region.

At the Guinean border, the climate is rather wet, but becomes Sudanian and later Sahelian to the north.

The largest cities in the region are Kayes, Kita, Bafoulabé, Nioro du Sahel, Diéma, Yélimané, Sadiola, and Kéniéba 
The Bafing National Park and the Boucle du Baoulé National Park are located in the region.

Cercles 
For administrative purposes the Region of Kayes is divided into seven cercles:

History 
The region of Kayes is the cradle of the Kingdom of Khasso founded at the beginning of the 19th century.

In 1855, Louis Faidherbe, Governor of Senegal, built a fort at Medina which would be besieged by El Hadj Omar Tall, in an 1857 war against the sovereign of Khasso. In 1892, the town of Kayes became the capital of French Sudan.

The construction of the railway line of Dakar-Niger, inaugurated in 1904, made of Kayes a city-crossroads. Essential at the time, the railroad had an important place in the lives of the inhabitants, as described in Ousmane Sembène's novel God's Bits of Wood.

See also
 Regions of Mali
 Cercles of Mali

References

External links
.

 
Regions of Mali
French West Africa